Kiribati is a full member of the Commonwealth, the IMF and the World Bank, and became a full member of the United Nations in 1999. Kiribati hosted the Thirty-First Pacific Islands Forum in October 2000. Kiribati has Least Developed Country Status and its interests rarely extend beyond the region. Through accession to the Lomé Convention, then Cotonou Agreement, Kiribati is also a member of the African Caribbean and Pacific Group. Kiribati maintains good relations with most countries and has particularly close ties to Pacific neighbours Japan, Australia, and New Zealand. Kiribati briefly suspended its relations with France in 1995 over that country's decision to renew nuclear testing in the South Pacific.

Kiribati established diplomatic relations with Taiwan in November 2003, but cut off all relations in September 2019 when Kiribati switched diplomatic recognition to Beijing. Taiwan's foreign minister stated that Kiribati had "unrealistic" expectations from China and ordered the embassy to evacuate.

Regional Relations

Kiribati maintains strong regional ties in the Pacific. Until recently it was a full member of the Pacific Islands Forum, the South Pacific Applied Geoscience Commission, the South Pacific Tourism Organisation, the Pacific Regional Environment Programme and the Secretariat of the Pacific Community. Kiribati is one of the eight signatories of the Nauru Agreement Concerning Cooperation in the Management of Fisheries of Common Interest which collectively controls 25–30% of the world's tuna supply and approximately 60% of the western and central Pacific tuna supply . In 1985, Kiribati was one of the nine initial endorsers of the Treaty of Rarotonga creating the South Pacific Nuclear Free Zone Treaty.

Extra-regional relations

Kiribati was admitted to the Commonwealth of Nations in 1979 upon its independence, and to the United Nations in 1999.

Additionally outside the region, Kiribati is a member or participant of the ACP (Lomé Convention), the Asian Development Bank, the Economic and Social Commission for Asia and the Pacific (ESCAP), the Food and Agriculture Organization (FAO), the International Bank for Reconstruction and Development, the International Civil Aviation Organization, the International Red Cross and Red Crescent Movement, the International Development Association, the International Finance Corporation, the IMF, International Maritime Organization, International Olympic Committee, International Telecommunication Union (ITU), Universal Postal Union and the World Meteorological Organization. Finally, while Kiribati is not a member of the World Trade Organization, it does retain observer status.

Diplomatic missions
Kiribati has only two permanent missions abroad, the High Commission in Suva, Fiji, and a permanent mission to the United Nations in New York that serves also as Embassy in the US. It has honorary consulates in New Delhi, Abergavenny, Auckland, Sydney, Honolulu, Tokyo, and Hamburg. Formerly, there was an embassy in Taipei, Republic of China (Taiwan). In Kiribati, there are High Commissions from Australia and New Zealand and an embassy of the People’s Republic of China (re-opened in May 2020).

Kiribati and the Commonwealth of Nations

Kiribati has been a republic in the Commonwealth of Nations since 1979, when the Gilbert Islands gained independence.

Aid & Development

Kiribati receives development aid from the European Union, Australia, New Zealand, Japan, Canada, USA, the Asian Development Bank, UN agencies and (until 2019) Taiwan. In recent years it has accounted for 20–25% of Kiribati's GDP. Recent projects and notable inputs by the EU have included telecommunications (improvement of telephone exchanges and provision of radio and navigation equipment), the development of seaweed as an export crop, solar energy systems for the outer islands, the upgrading of the Control Tower and fire fighting services at Tarawa's Bonriki International Airport, outer island social development, health services and extensive support for the Kiribati Vocational Training Programme. Additionally, Cuba provides doctors, as well as scholarships for I-Kiribati medical students.

See also

Ministry of Foreign Affairs and Immigration
List of diplomatic missions in Kiribati
List of diplomatic missions of Kiribati

References

External links 

 Ministry of Foreign Affairs and Immigration
 Government of Kiribati Climate Change portal
 Tarawa Climate Change Conference website

 
Kiribati and the Commonwealth of Nations